The U.S. Army Medical Materiel Center-Southwest Asia (USAMMC-SWA), located at Camp As Sayliyah, Qatar, a subordinate unit of the United States Army Central Command at Camp Arifjan, Kuwait, serves as the Theater Lead Agent for Medical Materiel (TLAMM) for US Forces and select US Department of State activities throughout the US Central Command Area of Operations (AOR).

History
USAMMC-SWA was established as a provisional unit just before the start of Operation Iraqi Freedom, manned by the Soldiers assigned to the 6th Medical Logistics Management Center (6MLMC) from Fort Detrick, Maryland, the 388th Medical Battalion (Logistics) from Hays, Kansas and the 424th Medical Battalion (Logistics) from Coraopolis, Pennsylvania.

Commanders of the U.S. Army Medical Materiel Center-Southwest Asia

References 
This article contains information that originally came from US Government publications and websites and is in the public domain.

External links 
 6MLMC website

Medical Materiel Center